Onthophagini are a tribe of scarab beetles. Commonly placed in the true dung beetle subfamily (Scarabaeinae), it belongs to a group of subfamilies separated as subfamily Coprinae in some treatments.

Onthophagini often display sexual dimorphism, with the males having larger and more elaborate head and thorax ornaments, but not to the degree seen in the rhinoceros beetles of the scarab subfamily Dynastinae for example.

Genera

 Alloscelus
 Amietina
 Anoctus
 Caccobius Thompson, 1859
 Cambefortius
 Cassolus
 Cleptocaccobius
 Cyobius
 Diastellopalpus
 Digitonthophagus
 Disphysema
 Dorbignyolus
 Euonthophagus Balthasar, 1959
 Eusaproecius
 Heteroclitopus
 Hyalonthophagus
 Krikkenius
 Megaponerophilus
 Milichus
 Mimonthophagus
 Neosaproecius
 Onthophagus Latreille, 1802
 Phalops
 Pinacopodius
 Pinacotarsus
 Proagoderus
 Pseudosaproecius
 Stiptocnemis
 Stiptopodius
 Stiptotarsus
 Strandius
 Sukelus
 Tomogonus
 Walterantus

References

Scarabaeinae